No Count Sarah is a 1958 studio album by the American jazz singer Sarah Vaughan.

The title refers to the fact that Vaughan was accompanied by the Count Basie Orchestra, but without Count Basie. Reviewing the album for Allmusic, Scott Yanow gave it a four-and-a-half stars rating and called it "one of the best of all Sarah Vaughan recordings. Highly recommended". It features "astounding vocalese" from Vaughan on tracks including "Smoke Gets in Your Eyes" and "No 'Count Blues".

Track listing 
 "Smoke Gets in Your Eyes" (Otto Harbach, Jerome Kern) – 3:58
 "Doodlin'" (Horace Silver) – 4:34
 "Darn That Dream" (Eddie DeLange, Jimmy Van Heusen) – 3:43
 "Just One of Those Things" (Cole Porter) – 2:31
 "Moonlight in Vermont" (John Blackburn, Karl Suessdorf) – 3:19
 "No 'Count Blues" (Thad Jones, Sarah Vaughan) – 5:27
 "Cheek to Cheek" (Irving Berlin) – 5:09
 "Stardust" (Hoagy Carmichael, Mitchell Parish) – 3:17
 "Missing You" (Ronnell Bright) – 3:28

Personnel 
 Sarah Vaughan - vocals

The Count Basie Orchestra

 Wendell Culley, Thad Jones, Snooky Young & Joe Newman - trumpet
 Henry Coker, Al Grey & Benny Powell - trombone
 Marshal Royal & Frank Wess - alto sax
 Frank Foster & Billy Mitchell - tenor sax
 Charlie Fowlkes - baritone sax
 Ronnell Bright - piano
 Freddie Green - guitar
 Richard Davis - double bass
 Sonny Payne - drums
 Johnny Mandel, Luther Henderson, Thad Jones & Frank Foster - arrangers

References 

1959 albums
Count Basie Orchestra albums
Sarah Vaughan albums
EmArcy Records albums
Albums arranged by Frank Foster (musician)